John Bayes Norton (November 27, 1899 – November 24, 1987) was an American water polo player who competed in the 1924 Summer Olympics. He died in Lebanon, Pennsylvania. In 1924, he won the bronze medal with the American water polo team. He played three matches and scored three goals.

See also
 List of Olympic medalists in water polo (men)

References

External links
 

1899 births
1987 deaths
American male water polo players
Water polo players at the 1924 Summer Olympics
Olympic bronze medalists for the United States in water polo
Medalists at the 1924 Summer Olympics